Egge is the name of various elongated hill crests or ridges in the Low German dialect.  It may also refer to:

Places

Germany
 Egge (Lower Saxon Hills), a long ridge in the Lower Saxon Hills that continues the Teutoburg Forest to the south.
 Egge, a historical name for the river Egau, a tributary of the river Danube 
 Eggeberg (Egge region) (437 m), a hill in the Egge Region near Veldrom (Horn-Bad Meinberg), Lippe, North Rhine-Westphalia
 Große Egge (312 m), a hill in the Teutoburg Forest, Gütersloh, North Rhine-Westphalia
 Lutternsche Egge (256 m), a hill in the Wiehen Hills, near Volmerdingsen (Bad Oeynhausen), Minden-Lübbecke, North Rhine-Westphalia
 Egge (Wiehen Hills) (220.2 m), a side ridge of the Wiehen Hills that gives its name to the Eggetal valley, in Osnabrück and Minden-Lübbecke, Lower Saxony and North Rhine-Westphalia
 Hörster Egge (206 m), a high point in the Teutoburg Forest near Billinghausen (Lage), Lippe, North Rhine-Westphalia
 Schleptruper Egge (146.9 m), a hill in the Wiehen Hills, near Schleptrup (Bramsche), Osnabrück, Lower Saxony
 Larberger Egge (82.5 m) a high point near Achmer (Bramsche), Osnabrück, Lower Saxony
 Kleine Egge, a hill in the Teutoburg Forest near Kohlstädt (Schlangen), Lippe, North Rhine-Westphalia

Norway
Egge, Buskerud, a village in the municipality of Lier in Viken county
Egge, Nord-Trøndelag, a former municipality (1869-1964) in the old Nord-Trøndelag county
Egge, Innlandet, a village in the municipality of Gran in Innlandet county
Egge, Vestland, a village in the municipality of Gloppen in Vestland county
Egge Church, a church in the municipality of Steinkjer in Trøndelag county

Other uses
Egge (surname)

See also
 Eggen (disambiguation)
 Große Egge